Punahou School (known as Oahu College until 1934) is a private, co-educational, college preparatory school in Honolulu, Hawaii. More than 3,700 students attend the school from kindergarten through 12th grade. Protestant missionaries established Punahou in 1841.

In 2006, it was ranked the greenest school in America.  In 2017, Punahou's sports program was ranked second nationally in the MaxPreps Cup standings.

Punahou's student body is diverse, with student selection based on both academic and non-academic considerations.

History
In 1795, King Kamehameha I overtook the land known as Ka Punahou in battle. After Kameeiamoku died, the land passed to his son, Ulumāheihei Hoapili, who lived there for 20 more years. When Hoapili left to become governor of Maui, he gave the land to his daughter, Kuini Liliha.

Liliha and her husband, Oahu Governor Boki, gave Ka Punahou to Reverend Hiram Bingham, one of the first Protestant missionaries in Hawaii. Queen Kaahumanu was a strong supporter of the mission and built a house for herself near Bingham. A portion of the stone wall she had built to protect the compound from roaming cattle has been preserved.

Punahou School was originally a school for the children of missionaries serving throughout the Pacific region. It was the first school west of the Rocky Mountains and east of Asia with classes in English only. The first class was held on July 11, 1842, and had 15 students. Daniel Dole was Punahou's first principal.

Punahou has educated members of the Hawaiian royal family, but is not to be confused with the Royal School. It was known as Oahu College from 1853 to 1934.

During World War II, the U.S. Army Corps of Engineers commandeered much of the Punahou campus. Castle Hall, formerly the girls' dormitory when Punahou had boarding students, was used as a command center, buildings were connected with tunnels, athletic fields were used as parking lots, and the library was cleared to become sleeping quarters and an officer's mess. The cereus hedge on the campus lava rock wall was topped with barbed wire. Punahou students volunteered in hospitals and raised enough in war bonds to purchase two bombers and a fighter (among other airplanes), which were named after alumni who had fallen in service.

In the 1970s, Punahou's upper field and gymnasium were used for the Superstars nationally televised athletic competitions.

On August 7, 1972, the campus was added to the National Register of Historic Places listings in Oahu.

Traditions

Many traditional events take place on campus. On the first Friday and Saturday of each February, the junior class hosts the Punahou Carnival. Proceeds from the carnival contribute to the Financial Aid program. The event is an entertainment highlight each year in Honolulu.

The Holoku Pageant is an annual celebration of the Hawaiian culture and arts. Students perform Hawaiian dances in traditional costumes, from the lovely hula to the intimidating ha'a.

The annual Sustainability Fair began in 2007 and included on-campus conservation challenges and off-campus coastline preservation. On Rice Field, classes set up canopies to showcase sustainable undertakings and projects, often including local produce sales and informational handouts.

To celebrate the school's homecoming, students, faculty, and teachers surround a 20-foot letter P, and ignite it at dusk. This event, the "Flaming P", is preceded by a spirit week, where students dress and parade creatively.

Seniors write and perform a Variety Show. This play involves most of the class, over 300 students. Seniors also have prom at the Sheraton Waikiki Hotel, Skip Day at the Kikila Estate and Pounders Beach, and senior lunch. With each student attired in either a blue blazer or a formal white Hawaiian dress, senior year ends with baccalaureate ceremonies at Central Union Church, and commencement at Stan Sheriff Center (since 2018).

Graduates who started Punahou in kindergarten are members of the Thirteen Plus Club.

In June, the school hosts an Alumni Luau on campus that the newly graduated class can enjoy with other alumni. The annual luau also functions as a major fundraising event for the school.

Throughout most of the school's history, elementary schoolchildren have been allowed to attend in bare feet. Aloha shirts were once restricted to Fridays, but dress codes were relaxed considerably during the 1970s.

G-Term is an effort for students to explore extracurricular opportunities over the week after students return from winter break. Students can choose from on- and off-island classes.

Location

All schools in Honolulu city (public and private) have an urban residential location. Nearby buildings include apartment buildings, private houses, a retirement home, a Catholic school (Maryknoll School), several small churches, and two hospitals.

Punahou shares the entrance to Manoa Valley with the University of Hawaii main campus and a few other schools such as Mid-Pacific Institute.

Punahou students are a few minutes away from the trail to Manoa Falls, the beaches at Ala Moana and Waikiki, downtown Honolulu, Lyon Arboretum, and the National Memorial Cemetery of the Pacific.

Punahou's location provides many opportunities for off-campus learning: field trip destinations for middle school students have included the Bishop Museum, Waikiki Aquarium, Waikiki Shell, Waikiki Natatorium War Memorial, Kawaiahaʻo Church, Sea Life Park, USS Arizona Memorial, Valley of the Temples Memorial Park, Fort Ruger at Diamond Head, Hanauma Bay, Honolulu Museum of Art, Honolulu Zoo, Iolani Palace, Hawaii State Capitol, and the beaches on Oahu's North Shore. Clubs and classes often organize trips to neighboring islands, especially to Hawaii Volcanoes National Park and the Kohala Coast on the Big Island.

The school in recent years

Tuition was $26,000 for the 2019–20 school year, not including student activity fees.  Locals have long regarded Punahou as an expensive school, but its tuition is less than that of Harvard Westlake School or Sidwell Friends School, both of which charge over $35,000.

Tuition does not cover the entire cost of educating a student, and the school's endowment makes up the difference. Punahou reported its endowment at $239 million in 2014. Although these figures are high among mainland U.S. private schools, Honolulu's Iolani School has a comparable endowment (twice the endowment per pupil), and Kamehameha Schools has a $5 to $9 billion endowment (30 times the endowment per pupil) with a larger physical plant. Maui has Seabury Hall, which has twice the endowment per pupil.

In the class of 2015, three graduates went to Harvard, three to Princeton, and two to Yale, with 22 total at Ivy League schools. Seven attended Swarthmore, Wellesley, Amherst, Tufts, or Vassar. Four attended Stanford, two Berkeley, four Massachusetts Institute of Technology, 16 Boston University, and 12 New York University, with 23 total at University Athletic Association schools. Students in that class also chose Texas Christian, Notre Dame, Vanderbilt, Villanova, Rensselaer Polytecnic, Rochester Institute of Technology, Michigan, Northeastern, Boston College, Olin Engineering, Norwich Military College, NYU Shanghai, Erasmus/Rotterdam, Yonsei/S. Korea, Waseda/Japan, and Edinburgh/UK. Six decided to train at a US military academy. Schools throughout California, Washington, Oregon, Colorado, Utah, Arizona, and Nevada are also popular among graduates, and many students choose to attend local schools like the University of Hawaii and Chaminade.

The class of 2012 had 30 of Hawaii's 70 National Merit Semifinalists. The class of 2013 had 20 semifinalists, and five of the state's ten National Merit Scholars.

Punahou's 33 Presidential Scholars were graduates of the classes of '64, '66, '70, '71, '75, '78 (two), '79, '82, '84 (two members), '85, '86 (two), '91, '92 (two), '93, '95, '96, '98, '01, '02, '04 (three), '05, '06, '08, '11, '16 (two), '17, and '21.

In 2006, it was ranked the greenest school in America. In 2017, Punahou's sports program was ranked second nationally in the MaxPreps Cup standings.

Punahou's student body is diverse, with student selection based on both academic and non-academic considerations. The school is a founding member of the Mastery Transcript Consortium, and uses a competency-based learning framework in some courses.

A recent study of the class of 1979 showed that 15 had a PhD, 22 had an MD, 39 had a JD, 18 had the MBA, 10 had the DDS, DMD, DVM, or ND (about one quarter of the class reaching terminal degrees). 4 were officers in the US armed services. 12 had degrees from Harvard, Yale, or Princeton, 14 from Stanford, 17 from UC Berkeley, and 26 total from Ivy League schools.

Facilities

About 5,000 faculty, students, and staff work in 44 buildings on 76 acres. The Robert Thurston Memorial Chapel on campus was building designed and built in 1966 by architect Vladimir Ossipoff and feature textile screens made by local artist Ruthadell Anderson. The school is built over a natural spring.  Thurston Chapel's wall meets at a pond formed by the spring and features a low hung stained glass.

Case Middle School

Before plans were made for a new middle school complex, America Online founder and alumnus Steve Case ('76) donated $10 million. This led to construction of a new middle school for grades six through eight, Case Middle School, named for Case's parents. The project earned a Leadership in Energy and Environmental Design Gold certification and a Project of the Year award in Hawaiian Electric Company's Energy Efficiency Awards.

Sensors shut off air conditioners if windows are opened to let in the breeze; the buildings are designed to make full use of the tradewinds, with the help of the Venturi effect. There are also sensors in place that turn the lights on or off depending on whether motion is detected, and dim the lights on sunny days and brighten them on cloudy ones. Air conditioning is provided by three ice-making plants, one for each grade level's section. The units freeze and accumulate ice at night when electricity is cheaper, and allow the ice to melt during the day to cool the air.

Case Middle School consists of nine buildings with a total cost of roughly $50 million, made possible solely through donations.

Omidyar K-1 Neighborhood
In late 2010 a new five-building indoor/outdoor section of campus opened for Punahou's youngest students. It was constructed and operated with sustainable living as a principal goal, and the curriculum has a focus on sustainability. With solar energy, efficient landscaping, rain catchment and ecofriendly materials, the complex received a platinum rating from the U.S. Green Building Council.

Teachers are encouraged to personalize their classroom spaces, and each of the 12 rooms has its own outdoor area that is one-third the size of the interior space to which it is attached.

The total cost was $26 million. Individual buildings are named the Mountain House, Forest House, and City House, and historic Wilcox Hall retains its traditional name. Board of Trustees member and eBay founder Pierre Omidyar ('84) donated $6 million to the project.

Athletics
Punahou's athletics program is the most successful in Hawaii. It has won more state championships than any other high school in the nation. In 2008 and in 2009, Sports Illustrated ranked Punahou's sports program the best in the country.

Punahou football plays the second half of its season at the Aloha Stadium (where the Pro Bowl and Aloha Bowl were played). In fall 2014, the varsity football team ranked as high as 15th in the nation.

Athletic facilities include the Olympic-size Waterhouse Pool, a football field, a baseball diamond, two softball diamonds, and an eight-lane track. The school also has a fieldhouse for competitive athletics, an open-air weightlifting facility, a gymnasium for physical education and intramural sports, and a tennis center with eight hard surface courts.  Rocky Hill has been used as a live firing range for JROTC and competitive target sports. Air riflery uses an indoor firing range.

Students need two athletic credits to graduate, which is a total of four semesters. They can earn these credits through P.E. and ILH sports.

Students compete in 22 sports, including air riflery, baseball, basketball, bowling, canoe paddling, cross country, cheerleading, football, golf, gymnastics, judo, kayaking, riflery, sailing, soccer, softball, swimming and diving, tennis, track and field, volleyball, water polo, and wrestling. Punahou has approximately 120 sports teams. The school is a member of the Interscholastic League of Honolulu.

Punahou teams earned 20 championships in 2009–10, out of about 30 varsity I teams fielded.

State championships
{| class="wikitable"
|+State championships
|-
! Season !! Sport !! Number of championships || Year
|-
| rowspan="6"  || Football || style="text-align:center;"|2 + 12|| 2008, 2013 *State championship bowl instituted in 1973.  Prior to 1973, Punahou had 19 ILH championships.  As the OIA was founded in 1940, the ILH championships of 1909–1917, 1919–1920, and 1924 can be considered "state" or "island" championships.  Punahou is 2–3 in the state bowl against OIA opponents.
|-
| Volleyball, Girls || style="text-align:center;"|9 || 1973, 1993, 1996, 2000, 2003, 2004, 2011, 2012, 2014
|-
| Cross Country, Boys || style="text-align:center;"|13 || 1965, 1978, 1981, 1985, 1986, 1987, 1988, 1989, 1990, 1991, 1996, 2019, 2021
|-
| Cross Country, Girls || style="text-align:center;"|33 || 1973, 1974, 1978, 1979, 1981, 1982, 1983, 1984, 1985, 1986, 1988, 1991, 1992, 1995, 1996, 1997, 1999, 2000, 2005, 2006, 2007, 2008, 2009, 2010, 2012, 2013, 2014, 2016, 2017, 2018, 2019, 2021
|-
| Air Riflery, Boys || style="text-align:center;"|7 || 2005, 2006, 2007, 2008, 2009, 2011, 2014
|-
| Air Riflery, Girls || style="text-align:center;"|6 || 2001, 2002, 2005, 2008, 2011, 2016
|-
| rowspan="11" || Wrestling, Boys || style="text-align:center;"|8 || 1967, 1968, 2007, 2008, 2009, 2010, 2011, 2012
|-
| Wrestling, Girls || style="text-align:center;"|3 || 2009, 2010, 2011
|-
| Basketball, Boys || style="text-align:center;"|11 || 1970, 1974, 1975, 1979, 1980, 1981, 1990, 1999, 2008, 2012, 2018 
|-
| Basketball, Girls || style="text-align:center;"|11 || 1979, 1980, 1981, 1994, 1997, 1998, 2003, 2005, 2006, 2008, 2013
|-
| Soccer, Boys || style="text-align:center;"|22 || 1976, 1977, 1982, 1983, 1985, 1986, 1989, 1990, 1991, 1992, 1994, 1995, 1996, 1998, 2006, 2007, 2010, 2011, 2015, 2016, 2017, 2019, 2020
|-
| Soccer, Girls || style="text-align:center;"|11 || 1983, 1984, 1985, 1986, 1998, 2003, 2004, 2005, 2009, 2010, 2011
|-
| Swimming, Boys || style="text-align:center;"|49 || 1958, 1959, 1960, 1961, 1962, 1963, 1964, 1965, 1966, 1967, 1968, 1969, 1970, 1971, 1972, 1973, 1974, 1975, 1976, 1977, 1978, 1979, 1980, 1981, 1982, 1983, 1984, 1985, 1986, 1989, 1990, 1991, 1992, 1993, 1994, 1995, 1997, 1999, 2001, 2007, 2008, 2010, 2013, 2014, 2015, 2016, 2017, 2018, 2019, 2020
|-
| Swimming, Girls || style="text-align:center;"|54 || 1958, 1959, 1960, 1961, 1962, 1963, 1964, 1965, 1966, 1967, 1968, 1969, 1970, 1971, 1972, 1974, 1975, 1976, 1977, 1978, 1979, 1980, 1981, 1982, 1983, 1984, 1985, 1986, 1987, 1988, 1989, 1990, 1991, 1992, 1993, 1994, 1995, 1997, 1999, 2000, 2001, 2006, 2007, 2008, 2009, 2011, 2012, 2013, 2015, 2016, 2017, 2018, 2019, 2020, 2022
|-
| Canoe Paddling, Boys || style="text-align:center;"|8 || 2002, 2012, 2014, 2015, 2016, 2017, 2020, 2022
|-
| Canoe Paddling, Girls || style="text-align:center;"|7 || 2006, 2008, 2009, 2014, 2015, 2018, 2019, 2022
|-
| Canoe Paddling, Mixed || style="text-align:center;"|5 || 2009, 2014, 2015, 2019, 2022
|-
| rowspan="12" || Golf, Boys || style="text-align:center;"|10  || 1970, 1995, 1996, 1997, 2008, 2010, 2011, 2013, 2014, 2015
|-
| Golf, Girls || style="text-align:center;"|12 || 2007, 2008, 2009, 2010, 2011, 2013, 2014, 2015, 2016, 2017, 2018, 2022
|-
| Volleyball, Boys || style="text-align:center;"|38|| 1972, 1973, 1974, 1975, 1976, 1977, 1981, 1982, 1983, 1984, 1985, 1986, 1987, 1988, 1989, 1990, 1992, 1994, 1995, 1996, 1997, 1998, 1999, 2000, 2004, 2005, 2007, 2009, 2010, 2011, 2013, 2014, 2015, 2017, 2018, 2019, 2022
|-
| Water Polo, Girls || style="text-align:center;"|15|| 2004, 2005, 2008, 2009, 2010, 2011, 2012, 2013, 2014, 2015, 2017, 2018, 2019, 2022
|-
| Tennis, Boys || style="text-align:center;"|49|| 1958, 1959, 1960, 1961, 1962, 1963, 1964, 1969, 1970, 1972, 1973, 1974, 1975, 1976, 1977, 1979, 1983, 1984, 1985, 1986, 1987, 1988, 1989, 1991, 1992, 1993, 1994, 1995, 1996, 1997, 1998, 1999, 2000, 2001, 2002, 2003, 2004, 2005, 2006, 2007, 2008, 2009, 2010, 2011, 2012, 2013, 2014, 2015, 2016, 2022
|-
| Tennis, Girls || style="text-align:center;"|45|| 1959, 1960, 1961, 1962, 1963, 1964, 1965, 1966, 1967, 1968, 1969, 1970, 1971, 1972, 1973, 1974, 1975, 1976, 1977, 1978, 1981, 1983, 1984, 1985, 1986, 1988, 1989, 1990, 1991, 2003, 2004, 2005, 2006, 2007, 2008, 2009, 2010, 2011, 2012, 2013, 2014, 2015, 2017, 2018, 2019, 2022
|-
| Judo, Boys || style="text-align:center;"|3  || 2006, 2008, 2009
|-
| Judo, Girls || style="text-align:center;"|3  || 2009, 2010, 2011
|-
| Track and Field, Boys || style="text-align:center;"|36|| 1959, 1960, 1961, 1962, 1965, 1967, 1968, 1969, 1970, 1972, 1973, 1974, 1975, 1977, 1978, 1979, 1980, 1984, 1988, 1989, 1990, 1993, 1995, 1996, 1997, 1998, 1999, 2001, 2002, 2007, 2008, 2010, 2011, 2017, 2018, 2019, 2022
|-
| Track and Field, Girls || style="text-align:center;"|38 || 1967, 1968, 1969, 1970, 1972, 1977, 1978, 1979, 1981, 1982, 1983, 1984, 1985, 1986, 1987, 1988, 1989, 1990, 1991, 1992, 1996, 1997, 1998, 1999, 2000, 2001, 2004, 2005, 2006, 2007, 2009, 2010, 2011, 2012, 2013, 2018, 2019, 2022
|-
| Softball || style="text-align:center;"|1  || 2013
|-
| Baseball || style="text-align:center;"|14 || 1961, 1964, 1966, 1968, 1972, 1989, 2004, 2005, 2006, 2007, 2008, 2009, 2010, 2019
|-
| style="text-align:center;" colspan="2"|Total || style="text-align:center;"|'523’’’||
|}

Other programs and honors

Punahou requires all students (K-12) to attend chapel once a week, where each homeroom is assigned its own seating and attendance is taken. In addition, students attend a mandatory weekly assembly to listen to announcements or watch student performances.

Academy students have required coursework in Asian History, followed by US History and European History. Punahou also offers French, Spanish, Chinese, Japanese, Latin, and Hawaiian as languages starting in middle school.

Students have access to a jewelry studio, a pottery studio, glass-blowing facilities, technology departments, a  dance pavilion, and a dedicated music building. The campus has spaces for school-wide initiatives, e.g., for public service and international studies.

The high school yearbook, The Oahuan, has won awards from the American Scholastic Press Association. Na Opio is the yearbook for K-8. Ka Wai Ola is the school's long-running student literary publication. Ka Punahou is the student newspaper, and Punahou Bulletin is the alumni magazine.

Punahou has a strong history of academic competition with its math, debate, and academic bowl teams, and at times has had organizations for computing, chess, and gaming. Punahou's JROTC program was once known for its award-winning close order drill team with multi-person aerials using M1 Garand rifles.

Enrichment activities have included cultural clubs, dance and theater, funding and service committees, outdoor, environmental, and hiking clubs, pep clubs, and clubs based on sports such as martial arts and synchronized swimming. There are men's, women's and mixed choruses, a concert orchestra, and various band groups. Hui Le'a Nani ("heavenly singers") is the elite choral group.

Academy Clubs include (*=probationary): Academic Team,* Anime & Manga, Asante Ambassadors,* Astronomy Club, Book Club, Chess Club, Chinese Club, Civil Engineering Club,* Club Hospital Helpers,* Cycling Club, Design Thinking,* Easter Seals Club, Environmental Surf Club, European Culture Club,* Fellowship for Christian Athletes, Filipino Club, Film Club, Film Makers Club,* Free Movement Club,* Friends Granting Wishes,* Gay-Straight Alliance (GSA), Glass Club, Global Grindz Club,* Go Club, Hale Hawaii, Happy Club,* Hawaii Humane Society Club,* Hinano Hiking Club, Historical Film Club,* Hui O Aloha, IMAGEnation,* Impact and Inspire Club,* INK, Japanese Okinawan Club, Key Club, Korean Club, Lacrosse Club, Lemon Club,* Let's Do Stuff While Making Friends and Getting Exercise (LDSWMFGE), Math Team, Medical Science Club, Military History Club, Mock Trial, Mud Club, Music Club, Nature Nuts,* Neuro Club,* Nihonjin Club, Operation Smile,* Pa'i'ai Club, Pilates,* Polynesian Club, Punahou App Development Club,* Punahou Bible Study, Punahou Interact Club, Punahou Young Life Club, Punavision, Ranger Club, Robotics, Russian Club, Screen Printing Club,* Service-Learning Club, Social E,* Speech & Debate Team, Spoken Word and Poetry Club, Tea Society, TEDx, and Ultimate Frisbee Club.

The Punahou marching band travels periodically, and participated in the 2013 Presidential Inauguration, the 2012 London New Year's Day Parade, the 2009 Presidential Inauguration, the 2007 New Year's Day Rose Parade, and the 2015 Rose Parade. In 2013, 54 members of the school symphony played four concerts in China.

115801 Punahou is a minor planet named in the school's honor.

Sexual assault allegations and litigation
In April 2020, several former Punahou girls' basketball players filed a lawsuit over alleged abuse committed by their former coach Dwayne Yuen. Days later, the school disclosed additional sexual assault allegations dating back to the 1970s involving a former faculty member and baseball coach.

In January 2021, the school terminated the employment of a high school teacher based on allegations of sexual misconduct involving a former student. The teacher had been suspended from teaching and banned from campus since late November 2020 pending an internal investigation, which he did not cooperate with. The investigation found that the allegations were credible.

Notable students and faculty

 (Numerical claims are substantiated in the main article on alumni.  * indicates the class year of an attendee who did not graduate with the class.)

In public leadership

Punahou has produced many leaders in the government of Hawaii. Barack Obama ('79) was the 44th President of the United States. He attended Punahou from 5th grade until graduation.

Sanford Dole (1864) was President of the brief Republic of Hawaii, then Governor of Hawaii. Walter Frear (1881) and Lawrence M. Judd (1905) were also Governors.

Democratic Lt. Governor Brian Schatz ('90) was appointed U.S. Senator to complete Daniel Inouye's final term. Republican U.S. Senator Connecticut Hiram Bingham III (1892) was also elected governor of Connecticut. Otis Pike ('39*), Democratic Congressman from New York, chaired the Pike Committee investigating Richard Nixon. Republican Charles Djou ('88) recently finished Neil Abercrombie's term as Congressman from Hawaii. At least three other Punahou graduates have represented Hawaii in the U.S. House.

President Dwight Eisenhower appointed Judge Elbert Tuttle (1914) to lead the federal court that desegregated the South (the Fifth Circuit Four). HEW Secretary John W. Gardner ('29*) was President Lyndon Johnson's architect of the Great Society. Tuttle and Gardner were awarded the Presidential Medal of Freedom.

Sun Yat-Sen, the Founding Father of the Republic of China (esteemed by Taiwan as well as pre- and post-communist mainland China), attended Punahou (Oahu College) for a semester of study after graduating from Iolani School.

Pierre Omidyar, billionaire founder of ebay, founded The Intercept and other public-affairs websites.

In athletics

Alexander Cartwright III (1869) and his classmates were some of the earliest players of baseball (Alexander Cartwright, Jr., the official inventor of the game, spent the end of his life in Honolulu). The school claims at least one former pitcher and a former first baseman in major league baseball, and nine minor-leaguers. All-American Glenn Goya ('73) was an NCAA batting title winner.
 
Five-time women's golf LPGA event winner Michelle Wie graduated in 2007. Professional Golfers Association event winner Parker McLachlin graduated in 1997. Five-time Association of Tennis Professionals doubles winner Jim Osborne graduated in 1965. At least three alumni have been surfing world champions, including the five-time women's world tour winner Carissa Moore ('10).

DeForest Buckner ('12) was a 2016 first-round draft pick by the San Francisco 49ers and Pro-Bowl selection; his classmate Ka'imi Fairbairn ('12) is the Houston Texans' placekicker. Linebacker Manti Te'o ('09) was a 2012 Heisman Trophy finalist.

Punahou has also produced seven NFL linemen and four running backs, including Mark Tuinei ('78), who played 195 games over 15 years (team record) for the Dallas Cowboys, winning three Super Bowls and playing in two Pro Bowls. Ray Schoenke ('59*) played 145 games for the Cowboys and Redskins over twelve years. Charley Ane ('49) was a Pro Bowler and twice-NFL champion team captain, whose son, Kale Ane ('71), is the current Punahou football coach, after a career in the NFL. The elder Ane's brothers, Herman Clark ('48) and Jim Clark ('48), also played professionally. The four combined for a total of 260 NFL games over 20 seasons for the Packers, Chiefs, Lions, Redskins, and Bears. Pro Bowler and Super Bowler Mosi Tatupu ('74) played 199 games and redefined the importance of special teams.

Punahou's high school All-Americans have played football for Stanford, Michigan State (twice), Santa Clara, and Notre Dame (twice); All-American college football players have played at Harvard (twice), Navy, Stanford, Northwestern, Notre Dame, and Oregon.

Punahou has a tradition of sending athletes to the Olympic Games, with alumni contributing five gold, seven silver, and two bronze medals, competing in many of the modern games ('20, '24, '28, '32, '52, '68, '72, '76, '84, '88, '92, '96, '00, '04, '08, '12, '16, '21), and on every U.S. team since 1968 (Moscow '80 would have been the second of four Olympics for Henry Marsh ('72) if not for the U.S. boycott). Warren Kealoha ('25*) was the youngest gold medalist in swimming when he won the first of two gold medals.  Taylor Crabb and Carissa Moore competed in 2021, with Moore winning gold in the first Olympic surfing competition.

Punahou teachers and trustees have also won medals at the Olympic Games (see Punahou School alumni).

In academia

John W. Gardner taught at Stanford and Hiram Bingham III at Harvard, Princeton and Yale. Barack Obama lectured on Constitutional Law at the University of Chicago.

Punahou alumni include endowed professors at Berkeley, Stanford, UCLA, Duke, Illinois, Notre Dame, Purdue, and Boston University, and research professors of medicine at UCSF, UCLA, UCSD, USC, Stanford, Harvard, Columbia, Duke, Indiana, Texas, Maryland, Pitt, Walter Reed, and Baylor. John Lie ('78) wrote six books on Asian cultures, Patrick Vinton Kirch ('68) wrote nine books on Polynesian cultures, and Fred Hoxie ('65) wrote 20 books on Native American peoples.  Jesuit Father Robert Spitzer, SJ ('70) was the president of Gonzaga University. General George Forsythe ('66*), formerly the academic vice dean at West Point, is the president of Westminster College (Missouri). Marie Mookini ('74) was an admissions officer for Stanford University. William Richards Castle, Jr. (1896) was a Harvard Overseer. Elizabeth Bennett Johns ('55) has been a Guggenheim Fellow. Mount Rex is named for atmospheric science pioneer Lt. Cdr. Dan Rex ('33*).

William Ouchi ('61) wrote a book on Japanese business that is one of the top-100 most widely held books in U.S. libraries. Other prominent works by alumni (over 1000 citations for a single work, at scholar.google.com) are on leadership (Gardner '29*), plasma deformation (Killeen '42*), stability of silicates (Holdaway '54*), bird evolution (Steadman, '54), neuralgia vaccine (Gershon '56), coronary disease (3x, Labarthe '57), communicative acts (2x, Harnish '59*), dynamic choice (3x, Porteus '60), markets and bureaucracies (5x, Ouchi '61), floating point computation (Walther, '62), heart physiology (3x, Lederer '65), assay methods (Bennett, '66), marital conflict (4x, Cummings '68), gender equality (Roos '68), immunology (Umetsu '69), intraoperative melanoma (Wong '71), equal employment law (Krieger '72), bacteria viability (Oliver, '73), AIDS vaccination (2x, Michael '75), autophagy assays (Terada '75), virus expression (3x, R. Chung '78), stem cells (2x, Mankani '79), immunotherapy (Yuen '79), tumor pathogenesis (2x, D. Chung '80), legal construction of race (Haney-Lopez '82), nation building (Latham '86), and criminal records (Pager '89).

Samuel C. Armstrong (1859) and Elbert Tuttle were awarded Honorary Degrees from Harvard.  Armstrong founded a normal school (which later became Hampton University) to educate African-Americans and later Native Americans. He was also the founder of the Hampton University Museum, the country's oldest African-American museum and Virginia's oldest museum.

Punahou has a connection to Mills College through Punahou's former president, Cyrus Mills, who helped found Mills with his wife, Punahou teacher Susan Tolman Mills. Queenie B. Mills was a Kindergarten director who helped design the Head Start program.

In the arts

IMDb.com lists over 100 credits for Carrie Ann Inaba ('86) (In Living Color, Austin Powers in Goldmember, Dancing with the Stars) and 150 for Kelly Preston ('80) (Jerry Maguire, For Love of the Game, Only You, Twins). Sarah Wayne Callies ('95), has starred in Prison Break, Colony, and The Walking Dead.

Al Harrington ('54) starred in the original Hawaii Five-O and had a recurring character in the revived series.

Joan Blondell ('25*) has a Hollywood Walk of Fame star after 52 years in films and was a nominee for best supporting actress in 1951. Buster Crabbe ('27), who had won a gold medal in the 1932 Olympics, portrayed Tarzan, Flash Gordon, and Buck Rogers in film. Gerry Lopez ('66) is well known for surfing, but is also known as Subotai in Conan the Barbarian. Teri Ann Linn ('79) provided the beauty in The Bold and the Beautiful for over eight years. Scott Coffey ('81) appeared in Ferris Bueller's Day Off and was in two films with Naomi Watts (Tank Girl, Mulholland Drive) before writing and directing her indie bio pic, Ellie Parker. Amanda Schull ('96) had the lead role as an aspiring ballerina in Center Stage and featured in Suits.  Three alumni danced for the early Martha Graham. Leilani Jones ('75) won a Tony Award on Broadway and was on the original casts of Grind and Little Shop of Horrors. Ann Harada ('81) starred on Broadway in Avenue Q and Cinderella, and on TV in Smash.

Drew Matich '(82) has produced TV shows such as Fairly Legal, In Plain Sight, Terminator: The Sarah Connor Chronicles, Beautiful People, Joan of Arcadia, and Dawson's Creek. Rod Lurie ('80) has directed and produced a dozen films (Straw Dogs, The Contender) and two major TV series (Line of Fire, Commander in Chief). Kevin McCollum ('80*) directs a Broadway production company that claims 18 Tony Award-winning plays, and a Pulitzer Prize for Drama, three awarded personally (In the Heights, Avenue Q, Rent). Allan Burns ('53) was a 6-time Emmy Award-winning writer and creator, known for such shows as The Munsters, Get Smart, Mary Tyler Moore Show, and Rocky and Bullwinkle. Ken Peterson ('26) animated Snow White and the Seven Dwarfs, One Hundred and One Dalmatians, and Sleeping Beauty. John Kneubuhl ('38), a Samoan royal, was a writer on Wild, Wild, West, Star Trek, Hawaii Five-O, Gunsmoke, Mannix, and 40 other shows. Bruce Broughton ('62) is a film composer (Silverado, Tombstone, The Rescuers Down Under) and a 10-time Emmy-winner for TV themes (JAG, Tiny Toon Adventures). Iris Yamashita ('83*) was nominated for best original screenplay with Letters from Iwo Jima. Scott Moore ('85) co-wrote The Hangover, for which he received a BAFTA Best Original Screenplay nomination, and Bad Moms, which he also co-directed.

Kaui Hart Hemmings ('94) was author of The Descendants.

The Kingston Trio had two Punahou alumni as founders, Dave Guard ('52*) and Bob Shane ('52), producing five #1 albums on Billboard's charts, ten top-40 hits, and a #1 Grammy-winning single. The group won a Grammy Lifetime Achievement Award. Robin Luke ('59) was a Rockabilly Hall of Fame act. Hawaiian slack-key guitar is represented by the popular music of Henry Kapono Kaaihue ('67) of Cecilio & Kapono. Melody Ishikawa ('00) had three top-ten albums in Japan, Tané McClure ('77*) did much of the Terminator soundtrack, and Teri Ann Linn's ('79) debut CD went gold on the European charts.

In the military

General Samuel C. Armstrong led a rifle company that repelled parts of Pickett's Charge at the Battle of Gettysburg, and led U.S. Colored Troops.

Captain Francis Wai ('35) was awarded a posthumous Medal of Honor, Killed in Action in the Battle of Leyte Gulf.  

Admiral Thomas G. W. Settle ('14*) received the Navy Cross in World War II.  General Donald Prentice Booth ('22*) received the Distinguished Service Medal (U.S. Army) in World War II and the Cold War. General Ned Moore ('24) received the Distinguished Service Cross (United States) in the Korean War.  General Sidney Wooten ('24*) received the DSC in World War II and, with classmates Ned Moore and General Walter K. Wilson, Jr. ('24), the DSM during the Cold War.  General Philip Lindeman ('26) received the DSC in World War II and DSM in the Vietnam War.  General Tom Stayton ('26) received the DSM posthumously in Vietnam.  General Walter Jensen ('27) earned the DSM during the Vietnam War. Admiral Gordon Chung-Hoon ('29*) received the Navy Cross in World War II.  General Kelley Lemmon Jr. ('31*) and General Stanley Larsen ('33) received the DSC in World War II and DSM in Vietnam.  Admiral Chester Nimitz, Jr. ('32*) received the Navy Cross in World War II. 

Post World War II, William Robertson Desobry ('36) received the DSM in Vietnam, and General Ross T. Dwyer ('37) received the DSM (Navy) in Peacetime. General George Cantlay ('38) received the DSM in Vietnam and a Peacetime DSM (Defense). General George Patton IV ('42*) received the DSC in the Vietnam War and a Peacetime DSM. Admiral Kleber Masterson, Jr. ('50*) received a DSM (Navy) in Vietnam.

Many of the students were children of high level commanders stationed in the Pacific, such as Chester Nimitz, Jr. and George Patton IV. Admiral Grant Sharp '(56) and Admiral Stephen Clarey ('58) had fathers who would become Commander, U.S. Pacific Fleet. General Stephen Fuqua, Jr.'s ('28*) father was Chief of Infantry and Colonel Wallace Greene III's ('50) father was Commandant of the Marine Corps.

The school can claim at least fifteen Brigadier Generals, eleven Major Generals, six Lieutenant Generals, thirteen Rear Admirals, and three Vice Admirals. Stanley Larsen was the first commander of the Field Force, Vietnam and commander of the Sixth United States Army. Ross Dwyer was commander of the 1st Marine Division and George Cantlay was commander of the 2nd Armored Division. Donald Booth was commander of the Fourth United States Army. Kleber Masterson, Jr. commanded the United States Second Fleet. Admiral Thomas H. Copeman III ('77) was Commander, Naval Surface Forces Pacific and Commander, Naval Surface Forces Atlantic.

Colonel Farrant Turner ('13), Major Alex McKenzie ('29), and Major John Johnson ('31) commanded the Nisei 100th Infantry Battalion, a.k.a. the "Purple Heart Battalion." Johnson was Killed in Action at the Battle of Monte Cassino.

Lt. Michael T. McCormick (1964) was shot down in Vietnam War in 1973, recovered in 2002, and now rests in Arlington National Cemetery.

West Point graduates Generals Albert Lyman (1906*) and Charles Lyman (1908) were the first ethnic Hawaiians to attain that rank.  General C. B. Stewart ('30) was a Ph.D. in nuclear physics and General Frances Mossman ('50) has her J.D.  Admiral Alma Lau (Grocki) ('77) was a member of the 2nd Naval Academy class to admit women.

Many Punahou teachers in its history have been military reservists or ex-military.  Former computer and math teacher Henry Wells Lawrence was one of the first pilots to respond to the Attack on Pearl Harbor.

Others

Agnes Baldwin Alexander (1895)  was an author and Hand of the Cause in the Baháʼí Faith.

In 2007, Cox Enterprises passed to two former Punahou students who are highly philanthropic like their mother Barbara Cox Anthony, who twice married Punahou alumni; daughter, Blair Kennedy ('68*), a former schoolteacher, is now the second wealthiest woman in Australia; son James C. Kennedy ('65*) was Atlanta's philanthropist of the year 2007, and 61st on the Forbes 400 list 2012. Charles Gates, Jr. ('39) has donated $147 million through his Gates Family Foundation (Gates last appeared on the Forbes 400 list in 2006).

As mentioned above, the philanthropic founders of AOL and eBay were Punahou students, with both still listed on the 2012 Forbes 400. USA Today reported that Pierre Omidyar's ('84*) total charitable contributions exceeded $1 billion.

Charles L. Veach ('62) was an astronaut on two shuttle missions.

Nancy Cordes ('91) is a senior CBS News White House correspondent and anchor.  Emily Chang ('98) is the anchor and executive producer of Bloomberg news shows.

Punahou students were crowned Miss Hawaii or Miss Hawaii USA in 1977, 1981, 1997, 1999, and 2004 (with Judi Anderson ('76) becoming Miss USA and Brook Mahealani Lee ('89*) becoming Miss Universe).

Punahou students appear across the political spectrum, from Ronald Reagan's "favorite economist" and former Enron board member Wendy Lee Gramm ('62); Ryan Henry ('68) and Robert Silberman ('75), Deputy Under Secretary of Defense and Assistant Secretary of the Army, respectively, for George H. W. Bush; to centrist Ray Schoenke ('59*), a former Democratic candidate for Maryland Governor who founded the American Hunters and Shooters Association (an alternative to the National Rifle Association); to Jerry Berman ('58), chief counsel of the ACLU.

Ellery Chun ('27) invented the Aloha Shirt.

Punahou in fiction and literature

 "He started his scholarly investigation while still at Punahou, although he later took his B.A. at Yale, his M.A. at Harvard, his Ph.D. from Oxford and his D.Litt. from the Sorbonne. He received honorary degrees from eleven major universities, but when he died in 1914 the Honolulu Mail announced simply: 'The great scholar was educated at Punahou.' None of the rest really mattered." (James Michener, Hawaii)
 "Gramps grabbed me by the arm. 'Hell, Bar,' he whispered, 'this isn't a school. This is heaven.'" (Obama, Dreams from My Father)
 "I wanted a station wagon like the family in The Brady Bunch. I wanted to go steady with someone like Marcia or Jan, girls who dressed mod and spoke cool. My new school was full of girls like Marcia and Jan. I'd just started seventh grade at Punahou"  (Wright, Punahou Blues)
 In the Descendants, Matt (George Clooney's character) accuses Sid of being "a hundred miles away from Smartville." Sid responds that he is "Vice President of the Punahou chess club".
 In Hawaii Five O, Charlie Fong, the "extremely capable lab technician", is a Punahou graduate.
 "As part of chapel every year, the school held a special memorial day ceremony.  ... The JROTC cadets dressed in full gear and stood at attention the whole time. Arm in arm, a boy and girl from each grade level ... walked slowly down the aisle with a wreath of flowers ... while the names of all of those in the Punahou family, former students of the school who had been killed in war, were read off. ... By the end, the entire floor at the front of the chapel was filled with flowers." (Lum, Letting Go)
 "We had attended high school together at Punahou, the most exclusive private school in Hawaii." (Charley Memminger, Aloha, Lady Blue)
 "'What do people do here in the evening? The movies?' 'Just at present,' the girl told him, 'everybody visits Punahou ... to see the night-blooming cereus. It's the season now, you know.'" (Biggers, House Without a Key)

Alma Mater

Oʻahu A

Oʻahu a, Oʻahu aPunahou, our Punahou;Mau a Mau, oh mau a mau,Punahou, our Punahou.

Throughout the years we've shown our light,We glory in Oʻahu's might;The Buff and Blue's a glorious sight,Punahou, our Punahou.

The song is sung to the tune of Maryland, My Maryland, also known as "O Tannenbaum". The lyrics are taken from a poem, "Oahu Wa," by then student Wilhelm Albert Gartner (1902).

School shout
Ready? Hit it!
Strawberry Shortcake, Huckleberry Pie
V-I-C-T-O-R-Y
Are We In It? Well I Guess!
Punahou, Punahou, Yes, Yes, Yes!

This cheer is typically shouted by the marching band and cheerleaders at Punahou, at events such as football games and other sports activities and gatherings following the alma mater.

School mascot
Punahou does not have an official mascot. The closest thing is the hala tree, whose image is used in the school's seal. Fans often refer to athletic teams as the "Sons of Oahu", or "Buff & Blue". In 1890 the colors buff and blue officially became Punahou's school colors, representing sand and the sea. In 1890, long before the development of high-rises and hotels in Waikiki, all that was visible in the distance from the top of Punahou's campus was the buff-colored sand and blue-colored sea of Waikiki Beach.

See also

 List of Punahou School alumni

References

Further reading 
 A. Alexander, "Baseball at Punahou Thirty-Seven Years Ago", Oahuan, June 1906.
 Mary C. Alexander, C. P. Dodge, William R. Castle, Punahou, 1841–1941, U. California Press, 1941.
 John B. Bowles, Day Our World Changed: December 7, 1941; Punahou '52 Remembers Pearl Harbor, Ice Cube Press, 2004.  
 "Punahou School: a private school with a public purpose", Hawaii Business, September 1, 2003.  http://findarticles.com/p/articles/mi_go2021/is_200309/ai_n9142055
 T. K. Chow-Hoy, "An inquiry into school context and the teaching of the virtues", Journal of Curriculum Studies, 2001.
 D. Cisco, Hawaii Sports: History, Facts, and Statistics, University of Hawaii Press, 1999.
 Ethel Mosely Damon, The Seventy-Fifth Anniversary Pageant Punahou, published by the author, 1916.
 Charlotte P. Dodge, Punahou, The War Years, 1941–1945, 1984.
 Nelson Foster, ed., Punahou: The History and Promise of a School of the Islands, published by Punahou School, 1992.
 James A. Michener, Hawaii, New York, Random House, 1939. .
 Norris W. Potter, The Punahou Story, Pacific Books, 1969.
 Punahou Class of 1957, Na Halia Aloha o Punahou Class of 1957, June 2007 https://web.archive.org/web/20071127163651/http://www2.punahou.edu/pdf/Bulletin/Classof57BookWeb.pdf includes many historical photos and legend of founding.
 M. Tate, "The Sandwich Island Missionaries Lay The Foundation for a System of Public Instruction in Hawaii", The Journal of Negro Education, 1961.
 Kirby Wright, Punahou Blues, Lemon Shark Press, 2005.  .

External links

 
 Campus map
  (transcription of 1857 text about early history of the school)
 
 
 
 

1841 establishments in Hawaii
Educational institutions established in 1841
Historic American Buildings Survey in Hawaii
Historic districts on the National Register of Historic Places in Hawaii
National Register of Historic Places in Honolulu
Preparatory schools in Hawaii
Private K-12 schools in Honolulu
School buildings on the National Register of Historic Places in Hawaii
Christian schools in Hawaii
Schools founded by missionaries